Dali  (or Dhali;) is a large village in Cyprus, located south east of the capital Nicosia and close to the ancient city of Idalion. In 2001, it had a population of 5,834. By 2011, the population had almost doubled to 10,466.

Ancient Idalion

Idalium was an ancient city on place of modern Dali, Nicosia District. The city was founded on the copper trade in the 3rd millennium BC. Recent excavations have uncovered major buildings on the site which are open to visitors. A new museum is also near to the site. The ancient city was located in the fertile Gialias valley and flourished there as an economic centre due to its location close to the mines in the eastern foothills of the Troodos Mountains and its
proximity to the cities and ports on the south and east coast. Idalion prospered and became so wealthy that it was among the 11 cities of Cyprus listed on the Sargon Stele (707 BC) and first among the ten Cypriot kingdoms listed on the prism (many-sided tablet) of the Assyrian king Esarhaddon (680–669 BC).

References

Municipalities in Nicosia District
Phoenician colonies in Cyprus